Andrew James Mendez Hooper (born 17 September 1945) is an English former cricketer who played for Kent County Cricket Club between 1966 and 1969.

Hooper was born at Denmark Hill in London in 1945. He made his first-class cricket debut for Kent against Warwickshire in the 1966 County Championship at Canterbury, having played for the county's Second XI earlier the same season. He played primarily as a left-arm spin bowler, making 13 first-class appearances for Kent. His final match for the county was against Sussex in August 1969.

Hooper played regularly for Blackheath Cricket Club in the Kent Cricket League, captaining the First XI and winning the league Player of the Season award in 1984. He was capped by the Club Cricket Conference in 1980, playing for the CCC side between 1980 and 1984. In 1984 he moved to Hampshire where he played for Andover Cricket Club and was Director of Cricket and President at the club.

References

External links

1945 births
Living people
People from Denmark Hill
English cricketers
Kent cricketers